Russell Atkins (born February 25, 1926) is a musician, playwright, poet, and composer from Cleveland, Ohio, known primarily for his contributions to American avant garde poetry. He was born in Cleveland and raised on Cleveland's east side by three women – his mother, his grandmother, and his aunt Mae – after his father deserted the family. The family resided in Atkins' aunt Mae's home.

Trained as a musician and visual artist, Atkins studied at Cleveland College, Cleveland Music School Settlement, Cleveland Institute of Music, Karamu House, and Cleveland School of Art.

His plays The Abortionist and The Corpse debuted in 1954.  Following this, he founded Free Lance, A Magazine of Poetry and Prose in 1950 with his friend, Adelaide Simon, with the first issue containing an introduction by Langston Hughes. It attracted writers from all over the world, leading the now-defunct Black World to call it "the only Black literary magazine of national importance in existence." In 1959 Free Lance Press began publishing books, with a volume of poetry from Conrad Kent Rivers.  Free Lance was under Atkins leadership for more than two decades, and allowed Atkins to correspond with writers from across the country.

Russell Atkins resided in his aunt Mae's house on Cleveland's East Side for 62 years, until 2010, when the city took possession and demolished it. Afterward, he moved into the Fenway Manor apartments near Case Western Reserve University.

In 2017 the City of Cleveland granted a portion of Grand Avenue the supplementary name "Russell Atkins Way" in his honor.

Works

Atkins was one of the first Concrete poets in the United States, arranging the words on the page to enhance poems'  meaning.  He was also an innovator in poetic drama. Much of Atkins' work, including the verse drama The Abortionist, was published in issues of The Free Lance a literary journal published by Free Lance Press of Cleveland, Ohio.
 
Langston Hughes and Carl Van Vechten introduced Atkins' work to magazines.  Hughes read his poems at the University of Michigan and the University of Chicago, and Marrianne Moore read them on the radio in 1951.  
 
Atkins' books include Phenomena (1961), Objects (1963), Heretofore (1968), Maleficum (1971), Objects 2 (1973) and Here in The (1976), which is Atkins' only full length poetry collection.

Critical reception

Despite being published almost forty years ago and being long out of print, Here in The continues to attract critical attention. In 2014 the poet Joshua Ware, who teaches at Case Western Reserve University in Cleveland, Ohio wrote that "Atkins creates a singular, Cleveland-based beauty in his language and the sounds it produces." And "the poet surveys the city, its residents, and surroundings, noting how even traditionally beatific images, such as a sunset, can transform into something less gorgeous in the crumbling urban cityscapes."

Patrick James Dunagan wrote: "Both prolific and diverse, Russell Atkins’ literary output crosses over traditional divisions of genre, style, and form."

In 2013 the Pleiades Press at the University of Missouri published a collection entitled Russell Atkins: On the Life and Work of an American Master, and in October 2014 several of Atkins’ friends organized a reading and celebration of the poets’ work at the East Cleveland Public Library in East Cleveland, Ohio.

In 2017 he was awarded the Cleveland Arts Prize for his lifetime achievement.

In 2019, World'd Too Much: The Selected Poetry of Russell Atkins, edited by Kevin Prufer and Robert E. McDonough, was published by the Cleveland State University Poetry Center.

The Stuart A. Rose Manuscript, Archives, and Rare Book Library at Emory University holds the Russell Atkins collection, 1969-1997.

References

External links

Papers at Stuart A. Rose Manuscript, Archives, and Rare Book Library

1926 births
American modernist poets
Living people
Writers from Cleveland
Poets from Ohio
African-American dramatists and playwrights
American dramatists and playwrights
African-American poets
American poets
20th-century African-American people
21st-century African-American people
20th-century classical composers
21st-century classical composers
20th-century American composers
21st-century American composers
African-American classical composers
American classical composers
African-American male classical composers
American male classical composers
African-American opera composers
Male opera composers